Elm River Township may refer to the following places in the United States:

 Elm River Township, Wayne County, Illinois
 Elm River Township, Michigan

See also 
 Elm River (disambiguation)

Township name disambiguation pages